Bosnia and Herzegovina participated at the 2018 Summer Youth Olympics in Buenos Aires, Argentina from 6 October to 18 October 2018.

Athletics
 

Boys
Track & road events

Girls
Track & road events

Shooting

Bosnia and Herzegovina was given a quota by the tripartite committee to compete in shooting.

 Boys' 10m Air Rifle - 1 quota

Individual

Team

Swimming

Boys

Girls

References

2018 in Bosnia and Herzegovina sport
Nations at the 2018 Summer Youth Olympics
Bosnia and Herzegovina at the Youth Olympics